Cyanopepla dognini is a moth of the subfamily Arctiinae. It was described by Gustaaf Hulstaert in 1924. It is found in Paraguay and Brazil.

References

Cyanopepla
Moths described in 1924